Laura May Walkley (born 19 May 1991) is a footballer who plays as a midfielder for the Wales national team. She made her debut for Wales in March 2011.

References

External links
 
 

1991 births
Living people
Reading F.C. Women players
Wales women's international footballers
Welsh women's footballers
Women's Super League players
London Bees players
Women's association football forwards
Cardiff Met. Ladies F.C. players
Swansea City Ladies F.C. players